Driving into Walls (2012) is a play written by Suzie Miller and produced by Barking Gecko Theatre Company.

Development
Miller and director John Sheedy interviewed over 500 Western Australian teens for the play, asking about their day-to-day lives and drawing from that many of the stories of the play.

Plot
The plot of the story focuses on five teenagers and their online and offline relationships. The story does not follow a linear narrative and is more a collection of short stories with a shared message than one complete story.

Performances

Under the direction of John Sheedy, the show was first performed as part of the 2012 Perth International Arts Festival. It was later performed in the State Theatre Centre of Western Australia in the Underground studio.

Cast and production team

Cast:
 Michael Smith
 Harrison Elliott
 Matthew Tupper
 Rikki Bremner
 Thalia Livingstone
Choreographer: Danielle Micich
Production Manager: Jenna Boston
Stage Manager: Chris Isaacs
Lighting Designer: Matt Marshall
Sound Designer: Kingsley Reeve
Digital Artist: Sohan Hayes
Assistant Digital Artist: Glen Adams
Costume Designer: Alicia Clements
Vocal Coach: Luzita Fereday

References

Australian plays
Modernist theatre
2012 plays